Gunnar Rasmussen (30 January 1894 – 5 December 1945) was a Danish racewalker. He competed in the men's 10 kilometres walk at the 1920 Summer Olympics.

References

1894 births
1945 deaths
Athletes (track and field) at the 1920 Summer Olympics
Danish male racewalkers
Olympic athletes of Denmark
Place of birth missing